David P. Dixon (November 1898 – after 1930) was an English professional footballer who played in the Football League for Birmingham and for Southend United. He played as a right back.

Dixon was born in North Shields, which was then in Northumberland. He began his football career with South Shields and Preston Colliery before moving to Birmingham of the Second Division in May 1920. Dixon was always behind Frank Womack, Jack Jones and Eli Ashurst in the pecking order at full-back, and played only four league games in five seasons. He joined Southend United in May 1925, where again he played only four times in the Football League. He later played for Rhyl Athletic and Bedlington United, and retired from the game in 1931. He died in Newcastle upon Tyne.

References

1898 births
Year of death missing
Sportspeople from North Shields
Footballers from Tyne and Wear
English footballers
Association football fullbacks
South Shields F.C. (1889) players
North Shields F.C. players
Birmingham City F.C. players
Southend United F.C. players
Rhyl F.C. players
Bedlington United A.F.C. players
English Football League players